Wilhelm Soya (born 11 November 1935 – 4 July 1990), commonly known as Willi Soya, was a German professional footballer who played as a midfielder. He spent almost his entire career in the first-tier: in the Oberliga West with Schalke 04, in the Oberliga Nord for Werder Bremen, and in the Bundesliga for Werder Bremen after the league's establishment in 1963. He became German national champion with Schalke in 1958 and with Werder Bremen in 1964–65. After his second title, he left Werder Bremen and spent his final year of professional football with ASV Bergedorf 85 in the second-tier Regionalliga Nord.

Honours
Schalke 04
 German championship: 1958

Werder Bremen
 Bundesliga: 1964–65

References

1935 births
1990 deaths
German footballers
Association football midfielders
Bundesliga players
FC Schalke 04 players
SV Werder Bremen players